Bill Harrison is an American accountant and politician who was the mayor of Fremont, California, between December 2012 and December 2016, succeeding appointed mayor Gus Morrison.

Background and career 
He was born and raised in Fremont, is a graduate of University of California, Santa Barbara, and is a certified public accountant. 

Prior to 2012, Harrison was a city councilman. On November 6, 2012, Harrison out-polled four rivals to win the independently elected mayor's office with 34% of the vote.

References

Living people
Year of birth missing (living people)
Mayors of places in California
People from Fremont, California
University of California, Santa Barbara alumni
American accountants
21st-century American politicians